The women's 4 × 100 metres relay event at the 2014 African Championships in Athletics was held on August 12 at Stade de Marrakech in Marrakech, Morocco.

Results

Final

References

2014 African Championships in Athletics
Relays at the African Championships in Athletics
2014 in women's athletics